Peiping National Military Council was the Republic of China's supreme military command in charge of the National Revolutionary Army forces in Northern China in the 1930s prior to the beginning of the Second Sino-Japanese War.  As its name implies it was located in Peiping.

Peiping National Military Council
Peiping National Military Council
Military history of the Republic of China (1912–1949)